Jackie Areson (born 31 March 1988) is an Australian long-distance runner.

In 2013, she finished in 15th place in the final of the women's 5000 metres event at the 2013 World Championships in Athletics held in Moscow, Russia.

References

External links 
 

Living people
1988 births
Place of birth missing (living people)
Australian female long-distance runners
World Athletics Championships athletes for Australia
20th-century Australian women
21st-century Australian women